Wayne Township is one of the fifteen townships of Adams County, Ohio, United States. As of the 2010 census, the population was 1,304.

Geography
Located in the western part of the county, it borders the following townships:
Winchester Township - north
Scott Township - northeast
Oliver Township - east
Tiffin Township - southeast
Liberty Township - south
Byrd Township, Brown County - southwest
Jackson Township, Brown County - west

Two incorporated villages are located in Wayne Township: Cherry Fork in the center, and part of Seaman in the far north.

Name and history
Wayne Township was formed in 1806. It is named for Anthony Wayne.

It is one of twenty Wayne Townships statewide.

Government
The township is governed by a three-member board of trustees, who are elected in November of odd-numbered years to a four-year term beginning on the following January 1. Two are elected in the year after the presidential election and one is elected in the year before it. There is also an elected township fiscal officer, who serves a four-year term beginning on April 1 of the year after the election, which is held in November of the year before the presidential election. Vacancies in the fiscal officership or on the board of trustees are filled by the remaining trustees.

References

External links
County website

Townships in Adams County, Ohio
1806 establishments in Ohio
Townships in Ohio